Sociedade Esportiva Ariquemes, commonly known as Ariquemes, was a Brazilian football club based in Ariquemes, Rondônia state. They competed in the Copa do Brasil once.

History
The club was founded on October 2, 1981. Ariquemes won the Campeonato Rondoniense in 1993 and in 1994. They competed in the Copa do Brasil in 1994, when they were eliminated in the Second Stage by Vitória. The club eventually folded.

Achievements

 Campeonato Rondoniense:
 Winners (2): 1993, 1994

Stadium
Sociedade Esportiva Ariquemes played their home games at Estádio Gentil Valério, nicknamed Valerião. The stadium has a maximum capacity of 5,000 people.

References

Defunct football clubs in Rondônia
Association football clubs established in 1981
Association football clubs disestablished in 2008
1981 establishments in Brazil
2008 disestablishments in Brazil